Hynobius naevius, also known as the spotted salamander, Sagami salamander, Japanese salamander, and blotched salamander, is a species of salamander in the family Hynobiidae. It is endemic to northwestern Kyushu, Japan. Earlier records from Honshu represent other species.

Breeding takes place in streams where also the larvae develop. Hynobius naevius is common within its range and is not facing known significant threats. It probably can be found in several protected areas.

References

naevius
Endemic amphibians of Japan
Amphibians described in 1838
Taxa named by Coenraad Jacob Temminck
Taxa named by Hermann Schlegel
Taxonomy articles created by Polbot